Carlos Tobon (born February 3, 1982) is an American politician. He served as a Democratic member for the 58th district of the Rhode Island House of Representatives.

Tobon attended William E. Tolman High School, where he graduated in 2000. He then attended the Community College of Rhode Island and University of Rhode Island. In 2015, Tobon was elected for the 58th district of the Rhode Island House of Representatives, succeeding William San Bento]]. Tobon assumed office on January 6, 2015.

References 

1982 births
Living people
Place of birth missing (living people)
Democratic Party members of the Rhode Island House of Representatives
21st-century American politicians
Community College of Rhode Island alumni
University of Rhode Island alumni